Otto Valstad (11 December 1862 – 20 June 1950) was a Norwegian educator, painter, book illustrator and children's writer.

Biography
He was born at Asker in Akershus, Norway. He was the son of  Andreas Olsen Valstad (1828–1911) and Lisa Johansdatter Solstad (1836–1906). Valstad was an elementary school teacher until 1899. From the 1880s, he painted, especially landscapes, portraits and popular genres. He was a student at the  Norwegian National Academy of Craft and Art Industry under Johan Nordhagen and later briefly attended Académie Julian in Paris during 1897.
 
In 1893, he married novelist Mathilde Georgine "Tilla" Valstad (1871–1957). Otto and Tilla Valstad  were avid art collectors and their home in Hvalstad became a cultural centre. In 1949, they willed their property  to Asker municipality. His works are displayed at Asker Museum together with an extensive collection of art and cultural-historical objects.

Among his books are Juletræet from 1891, Smaakarer from 1910, Ola Enfoldig from 1916 and  Ola Mangfoldig from 1923. 
He is represented in the National Gallery of Norway with the portrait Fru Lina Brun from 1901.

References

External links
Asker museum website

1862 births
1950 deaths
People from Asker
Oslo National Academy of the Arts alumni
Norwegian educators
19th-century Norwegian painters
20th-century Norwegian painters
Norwegian male painters
Norwegian illustrators
Norwegian children's writers
19th-century Norwegian male artists
20th-century Norwegian male artists